Mohammed Bassim Ahmed Rashid (born 3 July 1995) is a Palestinian professional footballer who plays as a defensive midfielder for West Bank Premier League club Jabal Al-Mukaber and the Palestine national team.

Club career

Persib Bandung
On 17 June 2021, he signed a one-year contract with Indonesian Liga 1 club Persib Bandung. He made his professional debut for the club, in a 1–0 win against Barito Putera on 4 September 2021.

On 11 September 2021, Rashid made his first goals for the club when he scored a brace in 2021–22 Liga 1, earning them a 2–1 win over Persita Tangerang.

International career
Bassim was included in Palestine's squad for the 2019 AFC Asian Cup in the United Arab Emirates.

Career statistics

International

Honours
West Bank Premier League: 2023

Individual
 APPI Indonesian Football Award Fans Favourite Footballer: 2021–22
Persib Bandung Celebration of the Year 2021–22

References

External links
 
 
 
 

1995 births
Living people
Palestinian footballers
Palestinian expatriate footballers
Palestine international footballers
Association football midfielders
Hilal Al-Quds Club players
Al Jeel Club players
Persib Bandung players
Smouha SC players
West Bank Premier League players
Saudi First Division League players
Liga 1 (Indonesia) players
Egyptian Premier League players
2019 AFC Asian Cup players
Footballers at the 2018 Asian Games
Palestine youth international footballers
Palestinian expatriate sportspeople in Egypt
Expatriate footballers in Egypt
Palestinian expatriate sportspeople in Indonesia
Expatriate footballers in Indonesia
Expatriate footballers in Saudi Arabia
Palestinian expatriate sportspeople in Saudi Arabia